The Phall-O-meter is a satirical measure that critiques medical standards for normal male and female phalluses. The tool was developed by Kiira Triea (Denise Tree) based on a concept by Suzanne Kessler and is used to demonstrate concerns with the medical treatment of intersex bodies.

Schematic representation

History
The Phall-O-meter was developed by Kiira Triea based on a concept by professor of psychology Suzanne Kessler. Kessler summarized the range of medically acceptable infant penis and clitoris sizes in the book Lessons from the Intersexed. Kessler states that normative tables for clitoral length appeared in the late 1980s, while normative tables for penis length appeared more than forty years before that. She combined those standard tables to demonstrate an "intermediate area of phallic length that neither females nor males are permitted to have", that is, a clitoris larger than 9mm or a penis shorter than 25mm.

The meter was printed by the now-defunct Intersex Society of North America as a means of demonstrating concerns with the medical treatment of intersex people.

Anne Fausto-Sterling described how members of the intersex rights movement had developed a phall-o-meter, in her book Sexing the Body in 2000. Fausto-Sterling noted that, despite the existence of normative tables, clinicians' practices are more subjective: "doctors may use only their personal impressions to decide" on an appropriate clitoris size. Similarly, in a paper presented to the American Sociological Association in 2003, Sharon Preves cites Melissa Hendricks, writing in the Johns Hopkins Magazine, November 1993 on subjective clinical norms and their relationship to surgical management:

Copies of the Phall-O-Meter are now held by the Wellcome Library in London, and the Smithsonian Institution.

Related concepts
While the scale as used by the Intersex Society of North America was a satirical tool for activism, numerous clinical scales and measurement systems exist to define genitals as normal male or female, or "abnormal", including the orchidometer, Prader scale and Quigley scale.

See also 
 Intersex
 Sex assignment

References 

Male genital procedures
Female genital procedures
Intersex and medicine